The Canton of Chaulnes  is a former canton situated in the department of the Somme and in the Picardie region of northern France. It was disbanded following the French canton reorganisation which came into effect in March 2015. It consisted of 22 communes, which joined the canton of Ham in 2015. It had 7,410 inhabitants (2012).

Geography 
The canton is organised around the commune of Chaulnes in the arrondissement of Péronne. The altitude varies from 32m (Proyart) to 112m (Lihons) for an average of 87m.

The canton comprised 22 communes:

Ablaincourt-Pressoir
Assevillers
Belloy-en-Santerre
Berny-en-Santerre
Chaulnes
Chuignes
Dompierre-Becquincourt
Estrées-Deniécourt
Fay
Fontaine-lès-Cappy
Foucaucourt-en-Santerre
Framerville-Rainecourt
Fresnes-Mazancourt
Herleville
Hyencourt-le-Grand
Lihons
Omiécourt
Proyart
Puzeaux
Soyécourt
Vauvillers
Vermandovillers

Population

See also
 Arrondissements of the Somme department
 Cantons of the Somme department
 Communes of the Somme department

References

Chaulnes
2015 disestablishments in France
States and territories disestablished in 2015